List of Cal Poly alumni may refer to:
List of Cal Poly Pomona alumni
List of Cal Poly at San Luis Obispo alumni